Nikólaos Tselementés (Νικόλαος Τσελεμεντές) (1878 – 2 March 1958) was a Greek chef and cookbook author of the early 20th century. He is considered one of the most influential cookery writers of modern Greece,
specialising in both Greek and French cuisine.

Biography and career
He was born in Exampela, a village on the island of Sifnos and grew up in Athens, where he finished High School. At first, he worked as a notary clerk, then he started cooking, working at his father's and uncle's restaurant.

He studied cooking for a year in Vienna and, on his return to Greece worked for various embassies. He became initially known with the magazine Cooking Guide (Odigos Mageirikis) that he began publishing in 1910, which included – in addition to recipes – nutritional advice, international cuisine, cooking news, etc.

In 1919, he became manager of hotel "Hermes", while the next year he left for America, where he worked in some of the more expensive restaurants of the world, while also following higher studies in cooking, confectionery and dietetics.

In 1930, he published the influential cookbook Οδηγός μαγειρικής και ζαχαροπλαστικής, Cooking and Patisserie Guide.

He returned to Greece in 1932, founded a small cooking and confectionery school and brought out his well-known book of recipes, which, being the first complete cookbook in Greek, had over fifteen official reprints during the following decades. In 1950, he published his only book in English, Greek Cookery.

Influenced by French cuisine, he had been the moderniser of Greek cuisine as, thanks to him, the Greek housewives learned of béchamel sauce, pirozhki and bouillabaisse. He created also the modern versions of mousaka, pastitsio and anginares (artichokes) alla polita.

His name (Tselementés) is today in Greece a synonym of "cookbook", and is also used in jest about someone who can cook very well.

Bibliography
 Aglaia Kremezi (1996). "Nikolas Tselementes". In Walker, Harlan (Ed.) (1996). Cooks and Other People (Proceedings of the Oxford Symposium on Food and Cookery, 1995). Totnes: Prospect Books. . pp 162–169

References

Translated from Νικόλαος Τσελεμεντές in the Greek Wikipedia

Greek food writers
Greek chefs
1958 deaths
1878 births
People from Sifnos
Cookbook writers
Greek male writers
20th-century Greek writers
20th-century Greek male writers